Lake Pontchartrain is an estuary located in southeastern Louisiana in the United States. Some shipping channels are kept deeper through dredging.

In descending order of area, the lake is located in parts of six Louisiana parishes: St. Tammany, Orleans, Jefferson, St. John the Baptist, St. Charles, and Tangipahoa. The water boundaries were defined in 1979 (see list of parishes in Louisiana).

The lake is crossed by the Lake Pontchartrain Causeway, the longest continuous bridge over water in the world. A power line also crosses the lake. Its towers stand on caissons in Lake Pontchartrain, and its length can be used to visually demonstrate the curvature of the earth.

Toponymy 

The name  itself comes from the place in France where 's  is situated.

Description 
Lake Pontchartrain is an estuary connected to the Gulf of Mexico via the Rigolets strait (known locally as "the Rigolets") and Chef Menteur Pass into Lake Borgne, another large lagoon, and therefore experiences small tidal changes. It receives fresh water from the Tangipahoa, Tchefuncte, Tickfaw, Amite, and Bogue Falaya rivers, and from Bayou Lacombe and Bayou Chinchuba. It is one of the largest wetlands along the Gulf Coast of North America. It comprises more than 125,000 acres of wetland, including bottomland hardwoods and cypress swamps (although these have been severely degraded by past logging), along with a complex mixture of herbaceous wetlands including fresh, intermediate, and brackish marsh.

Salinity varies from negligible at the northern cusp west of Mandeville up to nearly half the salinity of seawater at its eastern bulge near Interstate 10. Lake Maurepas, a true freshwater lake, connects with Lake Pontchartrain on the west via Pass Manchac. The Industrial Canal connects the Mississippi River with the lake at New Orleans. Bonnet Carré Spillway diverts water from the Mississippi into the lake during times of river flooding.

History 
The lake was formed 2,600 to 4,000 years ago as the evolving Mississippi River Delta formed its southern and eastern shorelines with alluvial deposits. 
Human habitation of the region began at least 3,500 years ago.

Habitation increased rapidly with the arrival of Europeans; in 1699, French explorer  renamed the Lake  after .

In 1777, the great American naturalist, William Bartram, explored the north shore during a trip west. 
In 1852, a railroad was constructed to link New Orleans to the north. Engines turned at Pass Manchac. However, the pilings were burned to the water line in the Civil War.  

During the early 20th century, the great cypress swamps of the area were heavily logged and many have not regrown.

After over 30 years of oil drilling had yielded just 12 million barrels of oil and condensate and 119 billion cubic feet of natural gas, and caused major pollution of the lake, the State Mineral Board enacted a moratorium on oil drilling. As of 2009, there were 4 active wells continuing prior leases, and 25 derelict wells. According to the Louisiana Department of Environmental Quality (LDEQ) they and the US Coast Guard see at least one oil spill per day in Louisiana’s wetlands. Estuarine wetlands are among the highest on the Environmental sensitivity Index (ESI).

Conservation and restoration
Owing to past exploitation, the ecosystems of the lake have been placed under stress. Marshes, for example, are turning to open water, and cypress swamps are being killed by saltwater intrusion. However, brown pelicans and bald eagles, once scarce, were a common sight along the shores as of 2004. A team of experts assembled by The Nature Conservancy assessed the situation in 2004 and identified seven target habitat types in particular need of conservation management: bottomland hardwood forest, cypress swamp, relict ridge woodland, fresh/intermediate marsh, brackish/salt marsh, lake open water, and littoral submersed aquatic vegetation. The bottomland hardwood forest and cypress swamp are suffering from a lack of freshwater input and sediment deposition owing to the levees upstream from the lake. In addition, bottomland hardwoods are being invaded by exotic species such as Chinese tallow, while freshwater marshes are being invaded by exotic species such as elephant's-ear. The team identified four key animal species which could indicate the degree to which the system declines or improves. These were the rangia clam (representing lake bottom habitat), gulf sturgeon and paddlefish (representing fish communities), and the alligator snapping turtle (one of the largest freshwater turtles in the world, but in decline owing to over-harvesting).

The future of the lake depends, in part, on restoring annual spring floods to the wetlands of the lake basin, and controlling urban sprawl on the north shore. Selected species, like the paddlefish and alligator snapping turtle, would benefit from reduced harvesting. The lake could change considerably without such conservation planning. As of 2007 a few examples of future change included more cypress swamps converting to anthropogenic marsh or open water, Chinese tallow displacing native forests, and, with a warming climate, mangrove trees replacing brackish marsh. Hence, the ecosystems of the lake now, and in the future, depend very much upon some basic decisions about human activities in the vicinity of the lake, and, even more so, human activity upstream along the Mississippi River.

As of 2006, the population in the region was over 1.5 million. There have been many problems with the conservation management of the forests and wetlands. As of 1995, the United States Geological Survey was monitoring the environmental effects of shoreline erosion, loss of wetlands, pollution from urban areas and agriculture, saltwater intrusion from artificial waterways, dredging, basin subsidence and faulting, storms and sea level rise, and freshwater diversion from the Mississippi and other rivers.  With proper management of this lake and its wetlands, there is great potential to enhance the productivity of wetlands, and to maintain biological diversity to support an ecotourism industry that will diversify the economy.

Northshore 

The area north of Lake Pontchartrain is known as the North Shore, Northshore, or Northlake region. It includes the cities of Mandeville, Covington, Abita Springs,  Madisonville, Pearl River, Lacombe, and Slidell in St. Tammany Parish; Ponchatoula, Hammond, Amite, and Kentwood in Tangipahoa Parish; and Bogalusa and Franklinton in Washington Parish.

These three Northshore parishes are the eastern Florida Parishes. The landscape here is mostly uplands that were once dominated by long leaf pine savannas and interrupted by occasional large rivers.  The savannas were maintained by regular fires caused by lightning; they produced the distinctive fauna and flora of this region.

 
Lake Pontchartrain's south shore areas (dominated by New Orleans), instead of being designated by that name, are more likely to be referred to as either "East bank" or "West bank," depending upon their position with respect to the general north-south course of the Mississippi River. Lake Pontchartrain forms the northern boundary of the city of New Orleans, which is coterminous with Orleans Parish, and the northern boundary of its two largest suburbs, Metairie and Kenner; as well as forming the northern boundaries of Jefferson Parish and Saint Charles Parish, and much of the northern and eastern boundaries of Saint John the Baptist Parish.

New Orleans 
New Orleans was established at a Native American portage between the Mississippi River and Lake Pontchartrain. The lake provides numerous recreational activities for people in New Orleans and is also home to the Southern Yacht Club. In the 1920s, the Industrial Canal in the eastern part of the city opened, providing a direct navigable water connection, with locks, between the Mississippi River and the lake. In the same decade, a project dredging new land from the lake shore behind a new concrete floodwall began; this would result in an expansion of the city into the former swamp between Metairie/Gentilly Ridges and the lakefront. The Lake Pontchartrain Causeway was constructed in the 1950s and 1960s, connecting New Orleans (by way of Metairie) with Mandeville, and bisecting the lake in a north-northeast line.

Hurricanes 

During hurricanes, a storm surge can build up in Lake Pontchartrain. Wind pushes water into the lake from the Gulf of Mexico as a hurricane approaches from the south, and from there it can spill into New Orleans.

A hurricane in 1947 flooded much of Metairie, much of which is slightly below sea level due to land subsidence after marshland was drained. After the storm, hurricane-protection levees were built along Lake Pontchartrain's south shore to protect New Orleans and nearby communities. Due to cost concerns, the levees were built to protect against only a Category 3 hurricane; however, some of the levees initially withstood the Category 5 storm surge of Hurricane Katrina (August 2005), which only slowed to Category 3 winds within hours of landfall (due to a last-minute eyewall replacement cycle).

Experts using computer modeling at Louisiana State University after Hurricane Katrina have concluded that the levees were never topped but rather faulty design, inadequate construction, or some combination of the two were responsible for the flooding of most of New Orleans. Some canal walls leaked underneath because the wall foundations were not deep enough in peat-subsoil to withstand the pressure of higher water.

Funding 
Congress failed to fully fund an upgrade requested during the 1990s by the Army Corps of Engineers, and funding was cut in 2003–04 despite a 2001 study by the Federal Emergency Management Agency warning that a hurricane in New Orleans was one of the country's three most likely disasters. Raising and reinforcing the levees to resist a Category 5 hurricane might take 25 years to complete. Some estimates place the cost at $25 billion.

Hurricane Katrina 

When Hurricane Katrina reached Category 5 in 2005, some experts predicted that the levee system might fail completely if the storm passed close to the city. Although Katrina weakened to a Category 3 before making landfall on August 29 (with only Category 1-2 strength winds in New Orleans on the weaker side of the eye of the hurricane), the outlying New Orleans East area along south Lake Pontchartrain was in the eyewall with winds, preceding the eye, nearly as strong as those experienced in Bay St. Louis, Mississippi.  Canals near Chalmette began leaking at 8 am, and some levees/canals, designed to withstand Category 3 storms, suffered multiple breaks the following day (see Effects of Hurricane Katrina in New Orleans), flooding 80% of the city.

The walls of the Industrial Canal were breached by storm surge via the Mississippi River Gulf Outlet, while the 17th Street Canal and London Avenue Canal experienced catastrophic breaches, even though water levels never topped their flood walls. Louisiana State University experts presented evidence that some of these structures might have had design flaws or faulty construction.

There are indications that the soft earth and peat underlying canal walls may have given way. In the weeks before Katrina, tests of salinity in seepage pools near canals showed them to be lake water, not fresh water from broken mains. The  I-10 Twin Span Bridge heading northeast between New Orleans and Slidell was destroyed. The shorter Fort Pike Bridge crossing the outlet to Lake Borgne remained intact.

In this area, flooding was not the result of levee overtopping but was due to a decision by the governmental administration of Jefferson Parish to abandon the levee-aligned drainage pumping stations. This resulted in the reverse flow of lake water through the pumping stations into drainage canals which subsequently overflowed, causing extensive flooding of the area between I-10 and the lakefront. When the pump operators were returned to their stations, water was drained out of Metairie and Kenner in less than a day.
       
On September 5, 2005, the Army Corps of Engineers started to fix levee breaches by dropping huge sandbags from Chinook helicopters. The London Avenue Canal and Industrial Canal were blocked at the lake as permanent repairs started. On September 6, the Corps began pumping flood water back into the lake after seven days in the streets of New Orleans. Because it was fouled with dead animals, sewage, heavy metals, petrochemicals, and other dangerous substances, the Army Corps worked with the U.S. Environmental Protection Agency and Louisiana Department of Environmental Quality (LDEQ) to avoid major contamination and eutrophication of the lake.

Aerial photography suggests that  of water covered New Orleans as of September 2, which equals about 2% of Lake Pontchartrain's volume. Due to a lack of electric power, the city was unable to treat the water before pumping it into the lake. It is unclear how long the pollution will persist and what its environmental damage to the lake will be, or what the long-term health effects will be in the city from mold and other contamination.

Notable deaths 
 Eastern Air Lines Flight 304 crashed into the lake on February 25, 1964, resulting in the deaths of 51 passengers and 7 crew.
 On June 16, 1964, a Trailways bus plunged off the Lake Pontchartrain Causeway into Lake Pontchartrain, killing 6.
 On December 31, 1967, a chartered plane crashed into Lake Pontchartrain, killing 5 servicemen and the pilot.
 On September 15, 1978, six-year-old Benjamin Daly, along with the pilot, died when a private plane his parents had chartered crashed into the lake. His parents survived.
 On February 23, 1980, a twin-engine plane crashed into Lake Pontchartrain, killing 7.
 On January 15, 1981, a Piper PA-23 flying in heavy fog crashed into Lake Pontchartrain while on final approach to New Orleans Lakefront Airport, killing the plane's owner and pilot Joyce W. Hornady, the 73-year-old CEO of Hornady Manufacturing Company, and two other company employees Edward A. Heers, a 34-year-old engineer, and James W. Garber, a 29-year-old customer service manager.  All three men were due to attend and represent their company in the 1981 SHOT Show in New Orleans.
 In 1986, a decomposing woman's body was found by two fishermen. The cause of death was homicide by asphyxia. She was not identified and no leads were ever identified in the case.
 New England Patriots defensive end, New Orleans native and former LSU star Marquise Hill was found dead in Lake Pontchartrain on May 28, 2007.
 A U.S. Navy T-34 training plane crashed into the lake on January 23, 2010, after a routine training mission. The instructor, Lt. Clinton Wermers, was found dead at 0100 on January 27, 2010. The student pilot was rescued about two hours after the crash.

See also 

 Lake Pontchartrain Causeway
 Bonnet Carré Spillway
 Tammany Trace Rail Trail
 Louisiana's 1st congressional district
 List of lakes of the United States
 "The Lakes of Pontchartrain"

References

Further reading 
 Lake Pontchartrain, 2007,

External links 

 Lake Pontchartrain Visitors Guide
 Lake Pontchartrain Basin Foundation
 United States Geological Survey Lake Pontchartrain Fact Sheet
 Real-time water data for Lake Pontchartrain
 New Orleans history of the lake
 Lake Pontchartrain Basin Maritime Museum
 USGS Environmental Atlas of Lake Pontchartrain
 New Orleans District Water Management
 Washington Post article alleging levee faults, 21 September 2005
 National Geographic article about the levees, 2 September 2005
 Salon article about disaster predictions, 31 August 2005
 U.S. Geological Survey article about the Lake Pontchartrain Basin, 3 November 1995
 BBC article about environmental effects on the lake after the flooding of New Orleans, 8 September 2005

Estuaries of Louisiana
Bodies of water of Jefferson Parish, Louisiana
Bodies of water of Orleans Parish, Louisiana
Bodies of water of St. Charles Parish, Louisiana
Bodies of water of St. John the Baptist Parish, Louisiana
Bodies of water of St. Tammany Parish, Louisiana
Bodies of water of Tangipahoa Parish, Louisiana
Lagoons of Louisiana
Tourist attractions in Jefferson Parish, Louisiana
Tourist attractions in New Orleans
Tourist attractions in St. Charles Parish, Louisiana
Tourist attractions in St. John the Baptist Parish, Louisiana
Tourist attractions in St. Tammany Parish, Louisiana
Tourist attractions in Tangipahoa Parish, Louisiana
Oil fields by country